Prasat is a khum (commune) of Preah Netr Preah District in Banteay Meanchey Province in north-western Cambodia.

Villages

 Char
 Bat Trang
 Sampov Lun
 Phlov Leav
 Ta Am
 Ampil
 Kandal
 Thmei
 Ovmal
 Tonloab
 Kien Banteay
 Prasat
 Anlong Sar
 Kampream

References

Communes of Banteay Meanchey province
Preah Netr Preah District